HMS Prince of Wales was a 74-gun third rate ship of the line of the Royal Navy, launched on 4 June 1765 at Milford Haven.

Service
American Revolution: On 29 June 1777 captured American ship "Lord Camden" near Cape Finisterre, Spain.

She was broken up in 1783.

Notes

References
Lavery, Brian (2003) The Ship of the Line — Volume 1: The development of the battlefleet 1650–1850. Conway Maritime Press. .

Ships of the line of the Royal Navy
Ramillies-class ships of the line
1765 ships